The 2022–23 Virginia Tech Hokies women's basketball team represents Virginia Polytechnic Institute and State University during the 2022–23 NCAA Division I women's basketball season. The Hokies, are led by seventh-year head coach Kenny Brooks, and play their home games at Cassell Coliseum as members of the Atlantic Coast Conference.

Previous season

The Hokies finished the season 23–10 overall and 13–5 in ACC play to finish in a three-way tie for third place.  As the fifth seed in the ACC tournament, they defeated thirteenth seed Clemson in the Second Round and fourth seed North Carolina in the Quarterfinals before losing to eventual champions and first seed NC State in the Semifinals.  They received an at-large bid to the NCAA tournament where they were the fifth seed in the Spokane Region.  They lost to twelfth seed Florida Gulf Coast in the First Round to end their season.

Off-season

Departures

Incoming transfers

Recruiting Class

Source:

Roster

Schedule

Source:

|-
!colspan=6 style=| Regular season

|-
!colspan=6 style=| ACC Women's Tournament

|-
!colspan=6 style=| NCAA Women's Tournament

Rankings

AP does not release a poll after the NCAA tournament.

See also
 2022–23 Virginia Tech Hokies men's basketball team

References

Virginia Tech
Virginia Tech
Virginia Tech
Virginia Tech Hokies women's basketball seasons
Virginia Tech